Michael Oakman-Hunt (born 5 March 1993) is an Australian rugby union player who plays for the  in the Super Rugby competition.  His position of choice is flanker.

References 

Australian rugby union players
1993 births
Living people
Rugby union flankers
ACT Brumbies players